Diamictite (from Ancient Greek δια (dia-): through and µεικτός (meiktós): mixed) is a type of lithified sedimentary rock that consists of nonsorted to poorly sorted terrigenous sediment containing particles that range in size from clay to boulders, suspended in a matrix of mudstone or sandstone. The term was coined by Richard Foster Flint and others as a purely descriptive term, devoid of any reference to a particular origin. Some geologists restrict the usage to nonsorted or poorly sorted conglomerate or breccia that consists of sparse, terrigenous gravel suspended in either a mud or sand matrix.

Unlithified diamictite is referred to as diamicton.

The term diamictite is often applied to nonsorted or poorly sorted, lithified glacial deposits such as glacial tillite and boulder clay, and diamictites are often mistakenly interpreted as having an essentially glacial origin (see Snowball Earth). The most common origin for diamictites, however, is deposition by submarine mass flows like turbidites and olistostromes in tectonically active areas, and they can be produced in a wide range of other geological conditions. Possible origins include:

 glacial origin
 meltwater flow deposition
 unsorted moraine glacial till
 basal melt-out
 ice rafted sediments deposited by melting icebergs or disintegrating ice sheets (dropstones)
 volcanic origin
 lahars
 lahar mass flows entering the ocean
 marine origin
 debris flow
 turbiditic olistostromes
 mixing of sediments by submarine landslides
 tectonic origin
 fault gouge
 erosional origin
 regolith, in the form of a debris flow
 other mass wasting events
 extraterrestrial origin
 impact breccia

References

Further reading 
 Deynoux, M., et al. (Editors) (2004) Earth's Glacial Record, Cambridge University Press, pp. 34–39

External links
Illustration of a Canadian diamictite

Sedimentary rocks